Val Daly is an Irish Gaelic football manager and former player.

Originally from Mountbellew, Daly made his debut with the county side in the 1981 National League and played until the 1997 Championship season when he was player manager.

An All-Star in 1987 and 1990, Daly won five Connacht Senior Football Championship titles. As well as managing the Galway football team between 1996 and 1997, he was also appointed temporary manager of the Roscommon county football team in 2005, after the resignation of Tommy Carr from the post.

He is currently manager of his own club side Mountbellew–Moylough in the Galway Senior Football Championship.

His son John also played for Galway.

References

1962 births
Living people
All Stars Awards winners (football)
Foresters
Gaelic football managers
Galway inter-county Gaelic footballers
Mountbellew–Moylough Gaelic footballers